Biopower (or biopouvoir in French) is a term coined by French scholar, philosopher, historian, and social theorist Michel Foucault. It relates to the practice of modern nation states and their regulation of their subjects through "an explosion of numerous and diverse techniques for achieving the subjugations of bodies and the control of populations". Foucault first used the term in his lecture courses at the Collège de France, and the term first appeared in print in The Will to Knowledge, Foucault's first volume of The History of Sexuality. In Foucault's work, it has been used to refer to practices of public health, regulation of heredity, and risk regulation, among many other regulatory mechanisms often linked less directly with literal physical health. It is closely related to a term he uses much less frequently, but which subsequent thinkers have taken up independently, biopolitics, which aligns more closely with the examination of the strategies and mechanisms through which human life processes are managed under regimes of authority over knowledge, power, and the processes of subjectivation.

Foucault's conception 
For Foucault, biopower is a technology of power for managing humans in large groups; the distinctive quality of this political technology is that it allows for the control of entire populations. It refers to the control of human bodies through an anatomo-politics of the human body and biopolitics of the population through societal disciplinary institutions. Initially imposed from outside, whose source remains elusive to further investigation both by the social sciences and the humanities, and in fact, you could argue will remain elusive as long as both disciplines use their current research methods. Modern power, according to Foucault's analysis, becomes encoded into social practices as well as human behavior, as the human subject gradually acquiesces to subtle regulations and expectations of the social order. It is an integral feature and essential to the workings of—and makes possible the emergence of—the modern nation state, capitalism, etc. Biopower is literally having power over bodies; it is "an explosion of numerous and diverse techniques for achieving the subjugation of bodies and the control of populations". Foucault elaborates further in his lecture courses on biopower entitled Security, Territory, Population delivered at the Collège de France between January and April 1978:

It relates to governmental concerns of fostering the life of the population, "an anatomo-politics of the human body a global mass that is affected by overall characteristics specific to life, like birth, death, production, illness, and so on. It produces a generalized disciplinary society and regulatory controls through biopolitics of the population".<ref>Security, Territory, Population’’, see also note 71, p. 397 2007</ref> In his lecture Society Must Be Defended, Foucault examines biopolitical state racism, and its accomplished rationale of myth-making and narrative. Here he states the fundamental difference between biopolitics and discipline:

Foucault argues that the previous Greco-Roman, Medieval rule of the Roman emperor, the Divine right of kings, Absolute monarchy and the popes model of power and social control over the body was an individualising mode based on a singular individual, primarily the king, Holy Roman emperor, pope and Roman emperor. However, after the emergence of the medieval metaphor body politic which meant society as a whole with the ruler, in this case the king, as the head of society with the so-called Estates of the realm and the Medieval Roman Catholic Church next to the monarch with the majority of the peasant population or feudal serfs at the bottom of the hierarchical pyramid. This meaning of the metaphor was then codified into medieval law for the offense of high treason and if found guilty the sentence of Hanged, drawn and quartered was carried out.For an excellent account of this legislation see John Barrell Imagining The King's Death Figurative Treason, Fantasies of Regicide, 1793-1796 (2000) However, this was drastically altered in 18th century Europe with the advent and realignment of modern political power as opposed to the ancient world and Medieval version of political power. The mass democracy of the Liberal western world and the voting franchise was added to the mass population; liberal democracy and Political parties; universal adult suffrage-exclusively male at this time, then extended to women in Europe from 1906 (Finland) - 1971 (Switzerland, see Women's suffrage in Switzerland), and extending to people of African descent in America with the abolition of the infamous Jim Crow laws in 1964 (see Civil Rights Act of 1964 and Voting Rights Act of 1965).

The emergence of the human sciences and its subsequent direction, during the 16th and 18th centuries, primarily aimed at the modern Western man and the society he inhabits, aided the development of Disciplinary institution and furthermore, Foucault cites the human sciences, particularly the medical sciences, led to the advent of anatomo-politics of the human body, a biopolitics and bio-history of man. A transition occurred through forcible removal of various European monarchs into a "scientific" state apparatus and the radical overhaul of judiciary practices coupled with the reinvention and division of those who were to be punished.

A second mode for seizure of power was developed as a type of power that was stochastic and "massifying" rather than "individualizing". By "massifying" Foucault means transforming into a population ("population state"), with an extra added impetus of a governing mechanism in the form of a scientific machinery and apparatus. This scientific mechanism which we now know as the State "governs less" of the population and concentrates more on administrating external devices. Foucault then reminds us that this anatomo-biopoltics of the body (and human life) and the population correlates with the new founded knowledge of sciences and the 'new' politics of modern society, masquerading as liberal democracy, where life (biological life) itself became not only a deliberate political strategy but an economic, political and scientific problem, both for the mathematical sciences and the biological sciences–coupled together with the nation state.

Foucault argues that nation states, police, government, legal practices, human sciences and medical institutions have their own rationale, cause and effects, strategies, technologies, mechanisms and codes and have managed successfully in the past to obscure their workings by hiding behind observation and scrutiny. Foucault insists social institutions such as governments, laws, religion, politics, social administration, monetary institutions, military institutions cannot have the same rigorous practices and procedure with claims to independent knowledge like those of the human and 'hard' sciences, such as mathematics, chemistry, astronomy, physics, genetics, and biology. Foucault sees these differences in techniques as nothing more than "behaviour control technologies", and modern biopower as nothing more than a series of webs and networks working its way around the societal body.

However, Foucault argues the exercise of power in the service of maximizing life carries a dark underside. When the state is invested in protecting the life of the population, when the stakes are life itself, anything can be justified. Groups identified as the threat to the existence of the life of the nation or of humanity can be eradicated with impunity.

 Milieu intérieur 

Foucault concentrates his attention on what he calls the major political and social project, namely the Milieu, or the environment within. Foucault takes as his starting point the 16th century, continuing to the 18th century, with the milieu culminating into the founding disciplines of science, mathematics, political economy and statistics.Security, Territory, Population, pp. 55–86 2007 Foucault makes an explicit point on the value of secrecy of government (arcana imperii, from the Latin which means secrecy of power, secrets of the empire, which goes back to the time of the Roman empire in the age of Tacitus) coined by Jean Bodin and was incorporated into a politics of truth. Foucault insists, in referring to the term 'public opinion' ('politics of truth'), that the concept of truth refers to the term 'regimes of truth'. He mentions a group called The Ideologues where the term Ideology first appears and is taken from.Security, Territory, Population, pp. 55–86, pp. 83–84, note 27, 2007 Foucault argues that it is through 'regimes of truth' that raison d'état achieves its political and biological success. Here the modern version of government is presented to the population in the national media—in the electronic media television and radio, and especially in the written press—as the modicum of efficiency, fiscal optimisation, political responsibility, and fiscal rigorousness. Thus, a public discourse of government solidarity emerges and social consensus is emphasised through these four points. This impression of joint solidarity is continuously reproduced through inherited political rationality, in turn giving the machine (Foucault uses the term Dispositif) of the State not only legitimacy but an air of invincibility from its main primary sources: reason, truth, freedom, and human existence. Foucault traces the first dynamics, the first historical dimensions, as belonging to the early Middle Ages. 

One major thinker whose work forms a parallel with Foucault's own is the Medieval historian Ernst Kantorowicz.Parrhesia:A Journal of Critical Philosophy 5 pp. 9–18 2008Artur Golczewski Sovereign Right, Democracy and the Rule of Law Universitas 2006 Kantorowicz mentions a Medieval device known as the body politic (the king's two bodies). This Medieval device was so well received by legal theorists and lawyers of the day that it was incorporated and codified into Medieval society and institutions (Kantorowicz mentions the term Corporation which would later become known to us as capitalism, an economic category). Kantorowicz also refers to the Glossators who belonged to a well-known branch of legal schools in medieval Europe, experts in jurisprudence and law science, appeal of treason, The Lords Appellant and the commentaries of jurist Edmund Plowden and his Plowden Reports. In Kantorowicz' analysis, a Medieval Political theology emerged throughout the Middle Ages which provided the modern basis for the democratisation of the hereditary succession of a wealthy elite and for our own modern political hierarchical order (Politicians) and their close association with the wealthy nobility. Primarily, this is the democratisation of Sovereignty, which is known in modern political terms as "Liberal democracy". Kantorowicz argues a Medieval triumvirate appears (with the support of the legal machine), a private enterprise of wealth and succession both supporting the fixed hierarchical order reserved exclusively for the nobility and their descendants, and the monarch and her/his heirs. Co-operation was needed by the three groups—the Monarchy, the Church, and the Nobility—in an uneasy Medieval alliance and, at times, it appeared fractious.Much of Madge's information comes from Charles Henry Pearson meticulous study of the domesday records.. Madge places the barons' majority ownership of all land at 50.5% in 1086 (in 1065 it was 50.7%). According to Madge's analysis of Pearson's work, by the time of the Norman conquest the monarch of the day—the king—wasn't, by all accounts, the major land owner; his percentage share was just 20.5% in 1065, before the conquest, and dropped to 19.9% after the conquest in 1086. Moreover, the monarch had to share that right with the powerful Roman Catholic church of the day (the church's share was 28.8% in 1065; at the end of the conquest in 1086 it was 29.6%). This necessitated an efficient accountancy and auditing system with the overall fiscal responsibility and liability of the Exchequer, Treasury and the entire kingdom of the realm (kingdom in this case meaning the Barons and the church who funded the King's expenditure) and its ruler the King, known as the Barons of the exchequer, supervised and organized by the barons of the day.Sidney J Madge, The Domesday Of Crown Lands, pp. 20–21, 1938. 

What is the reasoning behind the whole population subservience with the worshiping of state emblems, symbols and related mechanisms with their associates who represent the institutional mechanism (democratization of sovereignty); where fierce loyalty from the population is presented, in modern times as universal admiration for the president, the monarch, the Pope and the prime minister? Foucault would argue that while all the cost benefits were met by the newly founded urban population in the form of production and Political power, it is precisely this type of behaviour which enables social cohesion, and supports the raison dêtre of the Nation state as well as its capacity to "govern less."

Foucault makes special note on the biological "naturalness" of the human species and the new founded scientific interest that was developing around not only with the species interaction with milieu and technology, but most importantly, technology operating as system not as so often portrayed by the political and social sciences which insisted on technology operating as social improvement. Both milieu, natural sciences and technology, allied with the characteristics surrounding social organization and increasingly the categorization of the sciences to help deal with this "naturalness" of milieu and of the inscription of truth onto nature. Due to Foucault's discussions with Georges Canguilhem, Foucault notices that not only was milieu now a newly discovered scientific biological naturalness ever-present in Lamarckian Biology the notion (biological naturalness) was actually invented and imported from Newtonian mechanics (Classical mechanics) via Georges-Louis Leclerc, Comte de Buffon due to Buffon mentorship and friendship with Jean-Baptiste Lamarck and used by Biology in the middle of the 18th century borrowing from Newton the explanatory model of an organic reaction through the action of "milieu Newtonian" physics used by Isaac Newton and the Newtonians. Humans (the species being mentioned in Marx) were now both the object of this newly discovered scientific and "natural" truth and new categorization, but subjected to it allied by laws, both scientific and natural law (scientific Jurisprudence), the state's mode of governmental rationality to the will of its population. But, most importantly, interaction with the social environment and social interactions with others and the modern nation state's interest in the populations well-being and the destructive capability that the state possess in its armoury and it was with the group who called themselves the économistes (Vincent de Gournay, François Quesnay, François Véron Duverger de Forbonnais, and Anne-Robert-Jacques Turgot)Security, Territory, Population, pp. 333–61, pp. 348–49, 2007 who continued with the rationalization of this "naturalness". Foucault notices that this "naturalness" continues and is extended further with the advent of 18th century political society with the new founded implement "population" and their (political population) association with raison d'état.

 See also 

 Biopolitics
 Biopunk
 Foucault's lectures at the Collège de France
 Governmentality
Necropolitics

 References 

 Sources 
 Michel Foucault, Society Must Be Defended Michel Foucault, Security, Territory, Population Giorgio Agamben, Homo Sacer Michael Hardt and Antonio Negri, Empire Michael Hardt and Antonio Negri, Multitude Further reading 
 Bíos: Biopolitics and Philosophy By Roberto Esposito Bíos: Biopolitics and Philosophy Contains chapter on Thantopolitics By Roberto Esposito 24 August 2011
 Research In Biopolitics: Volume 9: Biology and Political Behavior: The Brain, Genes and Politics - the Cutting Edge (2011) edited by Steven A. Peterson, Albert Somit Research In Biopolitics: Volume 9: Biology and Political Behavior: The Brain, Genes and Politics - the Cutting Edge Accessed 11 August 2011
 Nicolas Delamare Traité de la police: où l'on trouvera l'histoire de son établissement Treaty of the police (1707) Accessed 11 August 2011
 Nicolas Delamare: A Brief Biography Nicolas Delamare: A Brief Biography Accessed 1 November 2011
 Policante, A. "War against Biopower: Timely Reflections on an Historicist Foucault" Theory & Event, 13. 1 March 2010
 Walter Bagehot Physics and Politics (1872) Accessed 3 January 2011
 Albion Small The Cameralists The Pioneers of German Social Policy 1909Accessed 13 November 2011
 Communication Power Manuel Castells (2009) Accessed 3 March 2011
 Biopolitics encyclopedia entry from Generation-Online Accessed 22 October 2010 
 The New Age Volume 10, Number 9 Biopolitics p. 197 London: The New Age Press, Ltd., 29 December 1911
 "Biopower. Foucault" on Philosophy.com: Gary Sauer-Thompson's Weblog Accessed 13 September 2009 
 Rabinow, Paul & Rose, Nikolas (2006) "Biopower Today", BioSocieties 1, 195–217 (London School of Economics and Political Science) Accessed 13 September 2009 
 Culture Machine eJournal Volume 7 (2005): Special edition on Biopolitics Edited by Melinda Cooper, Andrew Goffey and Anna Munster
 Foucault Studies: Number 10: November 2010: Foucault and Agamben Accessed 2 March 2011
 Foucault Studies: Number 11: February 2011: Foucault and Pragmatism Accessed 22 April 2011
 Foucault Studies: Number 7, September 2009: Review article By Marius Gudmand-Høyer and Thomas Lopdrup Hjorth The Birth of Biopolitics: Lectures at the Collège de France, 1978-1979 Accessed 25 July 2011
 Foucault Studies: Number 5, January 2008, Review Article By Thomas F. Tierney Security, Territory, Population: Lectures at the Collège de France 1977‐1978Accessed 25 July 2011
 Foucault Studies'': Number 12, October 2011 Review Article By Thomas Biebricher The Biopolitics of Ordoliberalism Thomas Biebricher The Biopolitics Of Ordoliberalism  Accessed 22 February 2012

Autonomism
Bioethics
Biopolitics
Michel Foucault
Political philosophy
Political science
Power (international relations)
Power (social and political) concepts